Dipterocarpus borneensis is a species of tree in the family Dipterocarpaceae. It is native to Borneo, Sumatra and Java.

It primarily occurs in lowland heath forests but also in mixed swamp forests and on raised beaches and plateaus.

References

borneensis
Flora of Borneo
Flora of Java
Flora of Sumatra